Harris City is an unincorporated community in Sand Creek Township, Decatur County, Indiana.

History
Harris City was named for B. B. Harris, who owned a large blue limestone quarry which was in the 19th century the center of the town's industry.

Harris City contained a post office between 1874 and 1898; the post office was called Harris in its final years.

Geography

References

Unincorporated communities in Decatur County, Indiana
Unincorporated communities in Indiana